Philippe Ragueneau (19 November 1917 – 22 October 2003) was a French journalist and writer.  He was born in Orléans (Loiret) and died in Gordes (Vaucluse).  Ragueneau was a resistance and then military fighter during World War II, and friend of the General Charles de Gaulle.

After the war, Reguneneau became a journalist and a political ally of de Gaulle, joining his cabinet in 1958. In the 1970s, he was a television writer and producer.

Distinctions

French
Commandeur de la Légion d'honneur
Compagnon de la Libération (17 November 1945)
Croix de Guerre 1939-1945 (3 citations)
Médaille de la Résistance
Médaille Coloniale
Croix du combattant volontaire 1939–1945
Médaille Commémorative des Services Volontaires dans la France Libre

Foreign
Africa Star (Great Britain)
1939-45 War Medal / mention in dispatches (Great Britain)
Silver Star (United States)

References 

1917 births
2003 deaths
Recipients of the Croix de Guerre 1939–1945 (France)
Recipients of the Silver Star
Recipients of the Resistance Medal
Commandeurs of the Légion d'honneur
French male non-fiction writers
20th-century French journalists
20th-century French male writers